Khaled Hussain Butt (born 7 August 1976) is a Pakistani-born cricketer who has played two One Day Internationals for Hong Kong.

External links 
CricketArchive
Cricinfo

1976 births
Living people
Hong Kong One Day International cricketers
Hong Kong cricketers
Pakistani emigrants to Hong Kong